Cruces, the formal plural of crux and a Spanish word for "crosses", may refer to:
 
Cruces, Cuba, a town in Cuba
Cruces River, a river in Chile
Río Cruces Bridge, a bridge that crosses Cruces River
Cruces River (Puerto Rico)
Cruces, Aguada, Puerto Rico, a barrio
Cruces, Rincón, Puerto Rico, a barrio
Cruces - Gurutzeta, a neighbourhood in Barakaldo, Spain
Gurutzeta/Cruces (Metro Bilbao), metro station in that neighbourhood
Cruces (peak), highest point of the Sierra de San Vicente, Sistema Central, Spain
Las Cruces, New Mexico, United States
Vila de Cruces, a town in Galicia, Spain
Villanueva de las Cruces, a town in Andalusia, Spain

See also
Crux (disambiguation)
Cruce, a surname